Chrysanthos Papachrysanthou (born 7 February 1979) is a Cypriot former swimmer, who specialized in sprint freestyle events. He is a four-time All-Academic honoree (1999, 2000, 2001, and 2002), and an eight-time All-Conference champion in freestyle swimming (50 and 100 m). In 2002, Papachrysanthou was named Dr. Charlotte West Scholar-Athlete Award Recipient for his full commitment and dedication towards academic and athletic excellence, service, and leadership.

As a member of the Cyprus team, Papachrysanthou made his official debut at the 2000 Summer Olympics in Sydney, where he competed in the men's 100 m freestyle. He rounded out the fifth heat to last place and fifty-seventh overall by 0.04 of a second behind Ecuador's Felipe Delgado in 52.82. By the following year, Papachrysanthou shared silver medals with France's Julien Sicot in the 50 m freestyle at the 2001 Mediterranean Games in Tunis, Tunisia in 23.06 seconds.

At the 2004 Summer Olympics in Athens, Papachrysanthou qualified for the men's 50 m freestyle by eclipsing a FINA B-standard entry time of 23.04. He challenged seven other swimmers on the sixth heat, including three-time Olympian Julio Santos of Ecuador. He edged out Thailand's Arwut Chinnapasaen to take a fifth spot by a hundredth of a second (0.01), outside his entry time of 23.51. Papachrysanthou failed to advance into the semifinals, as he placed forty-fifth out of 86 swimmers in the preliminaries.

Papachrysanthou is a member of the swimming team for Southern Illinois Salukis, and a graduate of physical education at Southern Illinois University in Carbondale, Illinois.

References

External links
Player Bio – Southern Illinois Salukis

1979 births
Living people
Cypriot male freestyle swimmers
Olympic swimmers of Cyprus
Swimmers at the 2000 Summer Olympics
Swimmers at the 2004 Summer Olympics
Sportspeople from Nicosia
Southern Illinois Salukis men's swimmers
Southern Illinois University alumni
Commonwealth Games competitors for Cyprus
Swimmers at the 2002 Commonwealth Games
Swimmers at the 2006 Commonwealth Games

Mediterranean Games silver medalists for Cyprus
Swimmers at the 2001 Mediterranean Games
Mediterranean Games medalists in swimming